is a lighthouse located on Cape Tsurugi on the southeastern extremity of the city of Miura, Kanagawa Prefecture, Japan on the southernmost and eastern tip of Miura Peninsula. (On the southernmost western tip of Miura Peninsula stands the Jōgashima Lighthouse.)

The Tsurugisaki Lighthouse was one of eight lighthouses to be built in Meiji period Japan under the provisions of the Anglo-Japanese Treaty of Amity and Commerce of 1858, signed by the Bakumatsu period Tokugawa Shogunate. The lighthouse was designed and constructed by British engineer Richard Henry Brunton. Brunton constructed another 25 lighthouses from far northern Hokkaidō to southern Kyūshū during his career in Japan.

The Tsurugisaki Lighthouse was completed on March 1, 1871, and was designed to protect shipping entering Tokyo Bay via the Uraga Channel, with its light visible as far as the Bōsō Peninsula on the eastern shore of the bay. The original structure was destroyed during the Great Kantō earthquake on September 1, 1923, and was replaced with the current reinforced-concrete structure on July 4, 1925. The lighthouse has been unmanned since 1991.

It is currently maintained by the Japan Coast Guard.

See also 

 List of lighthouses in Japan

References 
Brunton, Richard. Building Japan, 1868–1879. Japan Library, 1991. 
Pedlar, Neil. The Imported Pioneers: Westerners who Helped Build Modern Japan. Routledge, 1990.

Notes

External links 
 photo page
 Lighthouses in Japan 

Lighthouses completed in 1871
Lighthouses completed in 1925
Buildings and structures in Kanagawa Prefecture
Lighthouses in Japan
Miura, Kanagawa
1871 establishments in Japan
1925 establishments in Japan